A. Andrews (born 1818) was a state representative for Minnesota's 20th district serving Cottonwood, Faribault, Jackson, Martin, Murray, Pipestone, and Rock counties. He served in the Minnesota House of Representatives' 9th Legislature from 1867 to 1868. While in the state house, he served on the Incorporations, Indian Affairs, and Railroads committees. He was succeeded by A. B. Colton. Andrews came to Minnesota in 1864 and was a resident of Fairmont, Minnesota when he was elected in 1866.

References

1818 births
Year of death missing
Republican Party members of the Minnesota House of Representatives
Farmers from Minnesota
People from Fairmont, Minnesota
People from Winnebago, Minnesota